Pincourt-Terrasse-Vaudreuil is a commuter rail station operated by Exo in Terrasse-Vaudreuil, Quebec, Canada.  on weekdays, 9 of 11 inbound trains and 11 of 12 outbound trains on the line call at this station; one train each way is short turned and one inbound train skips the stop. On weekends, all trains (four on Saturday and three on Sunday in each direction) call here.

The station is located at the corner of 3e Avenue and 5e Boulevard, a short distance from the Boulevard Cardinal-Léger exit of Autoroute 20. It has two side platforms connected by the 3e Avenue level crossing, and is equipped with shelters but no station building.

Bus connections

CIT La Presqu'Île

References

External links
 Pincourt-Terrasse-Vaudreuil Commuter Train Station Information (RTM)
 Pincourt-Terrasse-Vaudreuil Commuter Train Station Schedule (RTM)

Exo commuter rail stations
Railway stations in Montérégie
Rail transport in Vaudreuil-Soulanges Regional County Municipality